Johnsburg may refer to some places in the United States:

Johnsburg, Illinois
Johnsburg, Indiana
Johnsburg, Minnesota
Johnsburg, New York
Johnsburg, Wisconsin